Virgil Cecil Garriott (August 15, 1916 – February 20, 1990) was an American professional baseball player during the middle of the 20th century.  An outfielder during his long career in minor league baseball, Garriott made six appearances as a pinch hitter at the Major League level for the Chicago Cubs in 1946.

Garriott was born in Harristown, Illinois, and graduated in the class of 1934 of Argenta High School, Argenta, Illinois.  He attended Millikin University.

His professional playing career lasted for 17 seasons (1936–1944; 1946–1953), interrupted by service in the United States Army during World War II.

Garriott's Major League trial came at the end of the  season. In six plate appearances, he reached base once when he was hit by a pitch thrown by Marv Grissom of the New York Giants on September 18. He scored his only MLB run that day during the Cubs' 4–3 victory at the Polo Grounds.

References

External links

1916 births
1990 deaths
Baseball players from Illinois
Chicago Cubs players
Columbus Red Birds players
Decatur Commodores players
Elmira Pioneers players
Los Angeles Angels (minor league) players
Macon Peaches players
Millikin Big Blue baseball players
People from Macon County, Illinois
Portsmouth Cubs players
Rochester Red Wings players
Victoria Tyees players
Visalia Cubs players